Become Who You Are is the second and final studio album released by Christian rock band Mainstay. It was released September 25, 2007.

Singles
"Believe" was the 20th most-played song of 2008 on U.S. Contemporary Christian music radio stations according to R&R magazine's Christian CHR chart.

Track listing
 "Become Who You Are"
 "Stars Are Singing" 
 "Away From You" 
 "Where Your Heart Belongs" 
 "Am I Keeping You?" 
 "Believe"
 "Only One"
 "Island"
 "When You Come Down"
 "Roads"
 "Story"
 "Don't I Look The Same"
 "Hang On"

Personnel
Justin Anderson – lead vocals, rhythm guitar
Scott Campbell – lead guitar
Dan Ostebo - bass guitar
Ryan DeYounge – drums

Jeremy Camp
Some of the songs of this album and Chris Tomlin's album Arriving were performed by them as the opening act on Jeremy Camp's Live Unplugged Tour

References

External links
Official Website

Mainstay albums
2007 albums